Balloon Corps may refer to

 History of military ballooning
 Union Army Balloon Corps, Civil War era
Observation Balloon Service in World War I
French Aerostatic Corps
British Balloon Command
German Balloon Corps